Konstantin Gustavovich Igelström (1799 - 1851) Russian Decembrist from the noble Swedish family of Igelström.

Konstantin Igelstrom was born in the city of Shumsk on 8 May 1799. He graduated from the Cadets Corps in 1816 and was made captain in 1825.

Founder and head of the secret Society of Military Friends, who initiated the protest of the Livland Pioneer Battalion, arrested on 27 December 1825 and put under surveillance in Białystok. The military court sentenced Igelstrom to death, but the highest decree of Nicholas I of Russia of 15 April 1827 deprived him of all nobility titles and condemned to penal servitude during 10 years in Siberia. After serving the sentence, he was prohibited from visiting Moscow or Saint Petersburg and settled in the city of Taganrog in 1843, where he worked as the assistant to the supervisor of the Taganrog's Customs' bonded warehouse. He died on 11 November 1851 and was buried at the Taganrog Old Cemetery.

External links and references
 Таганрог. Энциклопедия, Таганрог, издательство АНТОН, 2008

1799 births
1851 deaths
People from Shumsk
People from Volhynian Governorate
Baltic-German people
Russian nobility
Swedish nobility
Decembrists
Russian people of Swedish descent